Symplocarpus is a genus of flowering plants in the family Araceae, native to United States, Canada and eastern Asia. The genus is characterized by having large leaves and deep root systems with contractile roots used for changing the plant's level with the ground. Symplocarpus species grow from a rhizome and their leaves release a foul odor when crushed.

The best known species is Symplocarpus foetidus, commonly called "skunk cabbage".

Species
 Symplocarpus egorovii N.S.Pavlova & V.A.Nechaev - Primorye region of Russia
 Symplocarpus foetidus  (L.) Salisb. ex W.P.C.Barton - southeastern Canada and northeastern United States, from Tennessee to Minnesota and Nova Scotia
 Symplocarpus nabekuraensis Otsuka & K.Inoue - Mt. Nabekura in west-central Honshu in Japan
 Symplocarpus nipponicus Makino - Korea, northern Japan, northeastern China
 Symplocarpus renifolius Schott ex Tzvelev - Russian Far East, Korea, northern Japan, northeastern China

References

Araceae genera
Orontioideae